Organum is the ninth album of electronic composer Peter Michael Hamel, released in 1986 through Kuckuck Schallplatten.

Track listing

Personnel
Peter Michael Hamel – pipe organ, conch, tingsha
Athanasius Kircher – illustration
Ulrich Kraus – production, engineering
Oda Sternberg – photography
Irmgard Voigt – design

References

1986 albums
Kuckuck Schallplatten albums
Peter Michael Hamel albums